Hubcap City (From Belgium) is a band from Atlanta, Georgia that formed in 2000 after the end of Bill Taft and Will Fratesi's previous band, Smoke.

History 
The group played their first show at the Benjamin Smoke celebration, when Bill asked Will to play percussion on some of Bill's guitar and vocals-based songs.
These raucous, acoustic guitar-driven songs harkened back to the style of Bill's first band, The Chowder Shouters.
They continued as a duo for several years under the name Hubcap City, releasing several homemade CDs.
In 2003, they changed their name to Hubcap City (From Belgium), despite being Americans. The name hubcap city is taken from a Deacon Lunchbox poem.
They integrated this concept into their concerts, with Bill claiming to be named Leopold, and Will claiming to be named Wilhelm. Bill also introduced original songs as "The Belgian National Anthem.".
Also in 2003, Matthew Proctor joined the band (playing additional percussio, second guitar often lead and also contributing songs.  The song Sally on the Ponce 7 inch is a Proctor composition) while Will was playing drums on tour with Cat Power. When Will returned, Hubcap City (From Belgium) became a trio.
In 2005, Kat Hairston and Terry Boling joined the band, playing violin (also vocals) and saw, respectively. Kat Hairston left the band in the spring of 2007.
In 2006, HC(FB) released its first 7", the Deerhunter/Hubcap City Split on Rob's House Records. Later that year, they released their first full 7", "Sally" b/w "Five More Minutes (recorded a benefit for Todd Butler a close friend of Mr. Taft who also started Smoke)" on Ponce de Leon Records.
In 2007, Hubcap City (From Belgium) released their first nationally distributed CD, Superlocalhellfreakride.
They continue to perform as a five-piece.  Their next release is through the Ashton Velvet Rock Club Recording Company.  It will be a tape only release which is a split with Melissa Lonely.  www.myspace.com/avrcrc

Discography
EP 1 CD (2001, Self-released)
 Day Job
 My Punk Ass
 Paul's Boot
 My Wasted Friends
 Weegee
Live: 2001-2002 CD (2002, HIG Records 004)
 Action!
 Breakfast at Taxi Driver's
 The Man Who Never Forgets
 Hubcap City
 Paul's Boot
 Reservoir
 Some Things
 Stomp/Atomic Fireball
 Faulkner's Typewriter
 Debby
 Vital Pimp Flash
 Ready to Serve
 Rahab
 Jack Henry
 The Top of the Hill
 Sandbox
 Beautiful and Fucked Up
Tracks 1-8 recorded at WREK radio on 11/13/01.
Tracks 9 and 12 recorded outside at Railroad Earth Studios 5/19/01.
Track 10 recorded at Eyedrum 3/10/01.
Track 11 recorded 12/30/01 at The Earl.
Tracks 13-17 recorded 8/02/02 at Earthshaking Music.

EP 2 CD (2002, self-released)
 Reservoir
 Breakfast at Taxi Driver's
 Action
 Atomic Fireball
 Hubcap City

EP 3 CD (2004, self-released)
 Jack Henry
 Kiss Me, Arturo
 Left Eye Went the Wrong Way
 Sandbox
 Cat Hair on Rockabilly Dress
 Slug Party
 Door

More Songs For Dead Children CD (2004, self-released)
 Will's 4-Track
 Damaged
 Fried
 Hold On
 Slough of Despond
 Court
 Dumped
 Sassy Magazine Record Review #2: Dear Madonna
 One-Eyed Rapists Attack
 Unfinished Film Festival Song
 Beautiful and Fucked Up

 Super Local 13 CD (2005, self-released)
 Staircase
 Hurrah Hurrah
 U Don't Know Me Stomp
 Message Received 2:34 AM Thursday
 Guest of Honor
 Five Slugs More Party Minutes
 7 Zebra Heads 2 Plastic Skulls
 Yippie Yeah Yeah
 Message Received 2:51 AM Thursday
 Preacher
 Blackout
 Ham on Rye
 Snarl Baby Snarl

NOTE: All of the above CDs are only available through trade. All of the following recordings are or were also available for sale.

 Deerhunter/Hubcap City Split 7" (2006, Rob's House Records)
 Hubcap City - Mad House
 Deerhunter - Grayscale

 Five More Minutes b/w Sally 7" (2006, Ponce de Leon Records)
 Five More Minutes
 Sally

 Superlocalhellfreakride CD (2007, Xeric 112)
 Get Rid of Now	
 Unexpected Guest	
 Ring Around the Rosie	
 Wind Blowing on a Sick Man	
 Deer Hunting	
 Sticks in the Graveyard	
 Valley of Bones	
 No Return	
 When the President Sez	
 Bottle of Rum	
 He Brings the Hatchet in the Evening	
 Rahab	2:39	
 Boxcar Gamelan	
 Guy on Street	
 Hippest Trick		
 More Guy on Street	
 Arabella Sabotage	
 The Anti-Christ is Alive...

References

External links
 Official Hubcap City (From Belgium) Myspace
 Hubcap City Official website
 Stylus Magazine review of Superlocalhellfreakride
 2007 Interview with Bill Taft
 Hubcap City (From Belgium) recordings available at Stickfigure Distribution

Rock music groups from Georgia (U.S. state)
Musical groups from Atlanta
Musical groups established in 2000